The Palestine national under-20 football team is the national under-20 football team of Palestine and is controlled by the Palestinian Football Association. The team also serves as the national under-19 football team of Palestine.

The team is yet to qualify for both the FIFA U-20 World Cup and the AFC U-20 Asian Cup. However, Palestine's biggest achievement is reaching the semi-finals of the 2022 Arab Cup U-20.

History 
In July 2022, Palestine beat Sudan in the Arab Cup 5–3 to achieve its first victory in the history of the tournament. Palestine missed out yet again on a chance for a AFC U-20 Asian Cup finals appearance despite recording two wins and a draw. However, they suffered a heavy defeat, their worst ever by Japan.

Competitive record

FIFA U-20 World Cup

AFC U-20 Asian Cup

Arab Cup U-20

Recent results and matches

2022

Players

Current squad
The following 23 players were called up for the 2022 Arab Cup U-20.

See also
 Palestine national football team
 Palestine national under-23 football team
 Palestine national under-17 football team
 Palestine women's national football team
 Football in Palestine

References

External links
Official Website (in Arabic)

U
Asian national under-20 association football teams